Iskandaria kuschakewitschi, the Kuschakewitsch loach, is a species of stone loach found in the Central Asian nations of Uzbekistan and Afghanistan.

It is currently the only recognized species in this genus although the taxon Iskandaria pardalis is recognised by some authorities as a separate species.

References

Nemacheilidae
Fish of Asia
Taxa named by Solomon Herzenstein
Fish described in 1890